is a Japanese politician serving in the House of Representatives in the Diet (national legislature) as a member of the Liberal Democratic Party. A native of Yagi, Kyoto and high school graduate he was elected to the Diet for the first time in 2005 after serving as mayor of his hometown Yagi from 1992 to 2002.

References

External links 
 Official website in Japanese.

1951 births
Living people
People from Kyoto Prefecture
Japanese politicians with disabilities
Koizumi Children
Mayors of places in Japan
Members of the House of Representatives (Japan)
Liberal Democratic Party (Japan) politicians